PetroBangla (Bangladesh Oil, Gas & Mineral Corporation) is a government-owned national gas company of Bangladesh. It explores, produces, transports, manages and sells oil, natural gas and other mineral resources. It also concludes production sharing agreements with other international oil companies for exploration and development of oil and gas resources in Bangladesh.

History 

PetroBangla was founded in 1985 by merging two government organization, Bangladesh Oil & Gas Corporation (BOGC) and Bangladesh Mineral Development Corporation (BMEDC). To import liquefied natural gas, PetroBangla signed an agreement with Gunvor Singapore in 2018. In September 2019, Qatargas delivered the first cargo of liquefied natural gas from a Q-Flex vessel to Petrobangla's Floating Storage and Regasification Unit off Bangladesh. In January 2020, PetroBangla and Gazprom signed a Memorandum of Understanding for strategic cooperation.

The group's current Chairman is Nazmul Ahsan, appointed in December 2021 replacing Abdul Fattah who became Chairman in January 2020.

Gas distribution companies 

 Bakhrabad Gas Distribution Company Limited
 Jalalabad Gas Transmission and Distribution System Limited
 Karnaphuli Gas Distribution Company Limited
 Pashchimanchal Gas Company Limited
 Sundarban Gas Company Limited
 Titas Gas Transmission and Distribution Company Limited

References

External links 

 

Oil and gas companies of Bangladesh
Bangladesh
Government-owned companies of Bangladesh
Non-renewable resource companies established in 1972
Mining in Bangladesh
Energy companies established in 1972
Bangladeshi companies established in 1972
Bangladeshi companies established in 1985